George Felix Robert Michel Melki (born 23 July 1994), known as Felix Michel Melki, is a professional footballer who plays as a defender or midfielder for  club Ahed and the Lebanon national team.

After following his father's tracks playing at Syrianska for three years, Michel Melki moved to Turkish side Eskişehirspor in 2016. In 2018, he moved back to Sweden signing for AFC Eskilstuna and helped them gain promotion back to the Allsvenskan. In 2019 he transferred to Swedish champions AIK, who loaned him out to Sarpsborg 08 in Norway in 2021, before returning to AFC Eskilstuna the same year. In January 2023, Michel Melki moved to Lebanese side Ahed.

Born in Sweden, in 2018 Michel Melki opted to represent Lebanon at senior level, on account of having a Lebanese paternal grandfather. He played in all three group stage games for "the Cedars" at the 2019 AFC Asian Cup; he scored against North Korea and was named Man of the Match.

Early life 
Michel Melki was born in Sweden to a Swedish mother and a Syriac father, Robert Michel, who used to play for Syrianska when the team was still in the lower divisions of Swedish football. He has an older brother, Alexander, who also plays football.

In an interview with TRT World, Michel Melki stated that his grandfather was Lebanese, and that two of his father's sisters were born in Lebanon.

Club career

Syrianska 
At age seven Michel began his football career in the youth team of the Swedish side Syrianska FC, the club of the local Syriac community. Starting from 2013, he played in the first team and made some sporadic appearances in the league and domestic cup. He only began to establish himself as a starter in the 2016 season, making 10 league appearances.

Eskişehirspor 
In August 2016 he moved to the TFF First League side Eskişehirspor. Michel played 10 league matches for the Turkish club.

AFC Eskilstuna 
In March 2018 Michel signed for Superettan side AFC Eskilstuna, where he would be reunited with his brother Alexander. He made his debut on 24 April, as a 61st-minute substitute in a 2–0 win to Helsingborgs IF. In his first season, he made 21 league appearances and one cup appearance; he helped his side gain promotion to the Allsvenskan through the play-offs.

In the 2019 season, he started in 13 league and cup matches. Michel Melki scored the decisive goal in a penalty shoot-out against AIK, in the semi-finals of the Svenska Cupen on 17 March. He played the whole 90 minutes in the final, where they lost 3–0 to BK Häcken on 30 May.

AIK 
On 25 July 2019, Allsvenskan champions AIK announced the signing of Michel on a three-year deal. He made his league debut on 27 July 2019 as an attacking midfielder, in a 2–0 away win against IK Sirius. On 18 August 2019, Michel was placed as a striker against Kalmar, losing 2–1 at home. With eight league appearances (three as a starter), Michel helped his side reach fourth place in the 2019 Allsvenskan.

In the 2020 season, Michel Melki played all three Svenska Cupen group stage games, helping his side qualify for the quarter-finals. He played 11 games for AIK in 2020, six as a starter. In 2021, Michel Melki played two Svenska Cupen games.

Loan to Sarpsborg 08 
On 10 May 2021, Michel Melki was loaned out to Norwegian Eliteserien side Sarpsborg 08 until 2 August. He made his debut in the first match of the 2021 season on 16 May, as a second-half substitute in a 0–0 draw against Haugesund. He ended his loan with only one appearance, and returned to AIK.

AFC Eskilstuna 
Michel Melki returned to AFC Eskilstuna in the Superettan on 11 August 2021, joining them on loan until the end of the 2021 season. He made his debut on 14 August, as a 76th-minute substitute in a 4–1 win against Norrby. Michel Melki's first goal came on 22 August, scoring a backheel volley from a corner against GIF Sundsvall; the game ended in a 3–1 defeat.

Following the end of his loan period, AIK re-loaned Michel Melki to AFC Eskilstuna for a further six months on 11 January 2022, until the end of his contract with AIK. On 10 July, he joined AFC Eskilstuna permanently on a contract valid until the end of the 2022 season.

Ahed 
On 5 January 2023, Michel Melki joined Ahed ahead of the second round of the 2022–23 Lebanese Premier League.

International career 
In 2018, Michel Melki acquired a Lebanese passport due to his origins, making him eligible for the Lebanon national team. He made his international debut for Lebanon on 15 November 2018, playing the whole 90 minutes in a goalless draw against Uzbekistan. 
Michel Melki was called up for the 2019 AFC Asian Cup, alongside his brother Alexander, one month later. On 17 January 2019, he scored the equaliser in an eventual 4–1 win against North Korea in the final group stage game, and was nominated Man of the Match for his performance.

Style of play 
A versatile defensive-minded player, Michel Melki can mainly be deployed as either a centre-back or a defensive midfielder. His main characteristics are his physicality and his ball-winning capabilities. While at AIK, Michel Melki was also used as an attacking midfielder.

Career statistics

Club

International 

Scores and results list Lebanon's goal tally first, score column indicates score after each Michel Melki goal.

Honours 
AFC Eskilstuna
 Svenska Cupen runner-up: 2018–19

See also
 List of Lebanon international footballers born outside Lebanon
 List of association football families

Notes

References

External links

 
 
 
 
 

1994 births
Living people
Swedish people of Lebanese descent
Swedish people of Syrian descent
Swedish people of Assyrian/Syriac descent
Lebanese people of Swedish descent
Lebanese people of Syrian descent
Lebanese people of Assyrian descent
Sportspeople of Lebanese descent
Citizens of Lebanon through descent
People from Södertälje
Sportspeople from Stockholm County
Swedish footballers
Lebanese footballers
Assyrian footballers
Association football defenders
Association football central defenders
Association football midfielders
Association football utility players
Syrianska FC players
Eskişehirspor footballers
AFC Eskilstuna players
AIK Fotboll players
Sarpsborg 08 FF players
Al Ahed FC players
Allsvenskan players
Superettan players
TFF First League players
Eliteserien players

Lebanon international footballers
2019 AFC Asian Cup players
Swedish expatriate footballers
Swedish expatriate sportspeople in Turkey
Swedish expatriate sportspeople in Norway
Lebanese expatriate footballers
Lebanese expatriate sportspeople in Turkey
Lebanese expatriate sportspeople in Norway
Expatriate footballers in Turkey
Expatriate footballers in Norway